Carver Federal Savings Bank, opened under the leadership of M. Moran Weston in 1948, is the "largest black-owned financial institution" in the United States. Carver Bancorp, Inc. is its holding company.

Carver has been designated by the U.S. Treasury Department as a Community Development Financial Institution (CDFI).

History 
Carver applied for a federal charter "after the state had denied it a charter," and opened "in a simple storefront." Carver Federal Savings Bank was not the first bank named after George Washington Carver. Four years earlier another unrelated bank, Carver Savings and Loan Association, opened in Omaha, Nebraska. Neither of these were the first Black-owned American bank. This bank, however, is the largest and oldest continually Black-operated USA bank.

Weston already had earlier experience as 1945-founder of a credit union, and, for Carver, had a supporting team of 14.

Carver served multiple purposes:
 "to help black homeowners obtain first mortgages"
 Blacks trained at Carver went on to work at other banks
 along with Carver co-founder Josph E. Davis, it hired future leaders, such as Richard T. Greene Sr, "who for 30 years was the president and a director."

Branch structure 
Carver began operations at 53 West 125th Street in 1948.  On November 5, 1948, Carver Federal Savings and Loan Association received a federal bank charter. The first branch opened on January 5, 1949, in Harlem, New York at 53 West 125th Street.

In February 1961, Carver opened a second branch in the Bedford-Stuyvesant neighborhood of Brooklyn, New York. In June 1975, a third branch was opened in the Crown Heights section of Brooklyn, New York.

Carver'''s branch count was seven in 2001; by 2007 it was ten.

 Corporate structure 
In July 1982, Carver merged with Allied Federal Bank. Carver became a federal savings bank and changed its name to Carver Federal Savings Bank in 1986.

In 1999 the bank "headed off" an attempt by a Boston-based bank to take it over. The bank expanded in 2004 by acquiring Independence Federal Savings Bank''.

Carver Federal Savings Bank headquarters 
Carver Bank is headquartered in the Lee Building at 1825 Park Avenue in Harlem, New York. Its closest branch is at the location of the bank's previous headquarters, a four-story building at 75 West 125th Street, New York, NY which was owned and operated by Carver since 1956. The bank vacated the building between October 1992 and March 1996, after it was destroyed by an electrical fire. In 2018, it was sold by the bank.

Transition of leadership 
From 1948 to 1968, Carver was led by Joseph E. Davis, its first President and Chief Executive Officer ("CEO"). In 1970, Richard Greene was appointed president and CEO and led Carver for the next 25 years. In 1995, Thomas Clark Jr. was appointed director, President, succeeding Richard Greene. In April 1999, Carver's Board of Directors appointed Deborah C. Wright as its second female President and CEO. She retired as CEO on December 31, 2014. Effective January 1, 2015 Michael T. Pugh, the President and Chief Operating Officer succeeded Wright as CEO.

See also 
 Freedman's Savings Bank
 OneUnited Bank

References 

 A Shaky Pillar in Harlem: Black-Owned Carver Bank Is Resistant to Profitability and Change.
 From the New York Times Archive, July 11, 1999. Story by Leslie Eaton.
Carver Bancorp Inc. New York Times

External links 
 Official website

Companies listed on the Nasdaq
Banks based in New York City
Companies formerly listed on NYSE American
Black-owned companies of the United States